There are two species of skink named Far Eastern skink:

 Plestiodon latiscutatus, endemic to Japan
 Plestiodon finitimus, endemic to Japan and Russia